The 3rd Army Brigade is a mixed (mechanized infantry and armoured) brigade of the Serbian Army.

History 
The brigade was formed on 4 June 2007 from the former Army units located in eastern Serbia: 211th Armoured Brigade, 9th Infantry Brigade, 125th Motorized Brigade, 549th Motorized Brigade, 4th Motorized Brigade, 352nd Engineer Regiment, 52nd Air Defence Artillery Brigade and several other smaller units.

Structure
Brigade is concentrated in southeastern Serbia, from the border with Bulgaria in the east to the Danube and Velika Morava rivers in the north and west, and to Toplica area to the south. It consists of mechanized infantry, armoured, artillery, air defence artillery, engineer, signal and logistics units.

 30th Command Battalion - Niš
 31st Infantry Battalion - Zaječar
 32nd Infantry Battalion - Zaječar
 33rd Self-propelled Howitzer Artillery Battalion - Prokuplje
 34th Multiple Rocket Launcher Battalion - Prokuplje
 35th Air-defence Artillery Battalion - Niš
 36th Tank Battalion - Niš
 37th Mechanized Battalion - Kuršumlija
 38th Mechanized Battalion - Kuršumlija
 39th Logistics Battalion - Niš
 310th Engineer Battalion - Prokuplje

Equipment
M-84 main battle tank
BVP M-80 infantry fighting vehicle
BRDM-2 armoured reconnaissance vehicle
2S1 Gvozdika 122mm self-propelled howitzer
M-77 Oganj 128mm self-propelled multiple rocket launcher
Strela 1 short-range surface-to-air missile system
Bofors L/70 anti-aircraft gun
engineer and logistic vehicles and equipment

Traditions

Heritage
The 3rd Army Brigade continues traditions of the 2nd Infantry Regiment "Prince Mihailo" known as the Iron Regiment, the most decorated unit of the Royal Serbian Army  from World War I. The Iron Regiment was intrinsically rooted to Toplica region, where some of brigade's units are nowadays located.

Anniversary
The day of the brigade is celebrated on October 7. On that day in 1912, during the First Balkan War, the 2nd Infantry Regiment "Prince Mihailo" was sent to its first combat mission.

References

External links
3rd Army Brigade Web Page

Brigades of Serbia
Military units and formations established in 2007
2007 establishments in Serbia